Jonas Rosén (born 13 March 1958) is a Swedish fencer. He competed in the team épée event at the 1984 Summer Olympics.

References

External links
 

1958 births
Living people
Swedish male épée fencers
Olympic fencers of Sweden
Fencers at the 1984 Summer Olympics
Sportspeople from Stockholm
20th-century Swedish people